The Arena Ulm/Neu-Ulm, known for sponsorship reasons as Ratiopharm Arena, is an indoor arena in Neu-Ulm. It is the home arena of the basketball club Ratiopharm Ulm, and provides a seating capacity of 6,100 for basketball games. The result of a cooperation between the cities of Neu-Ulm and Ulm, the arena was opened in December 2011, and also hosts concerts and other events.

Gallery

References

External links
 Official website of the ratiopharm arena
 ratiopharm arena 1
 ratiopharm arena 2
 ratiopharm arena 3

Indoor arenas in Germany
Neu-Ulm (district)
Sports venues in Bavaria